Hovet is a mountain village in Hol, Buskerud, Norway.

Hovet is located between Strandavatnet and Hovsfjorden. Hovet is the site of Hovet Chapel (Hovet kapell). The church is located in the south-east slope of a hill that shoots out into the valley from the north. It was constructed from drawings prepared by architect Ole Stein and inaugurated in 1910. The walls are built of timber frame and rest on a grouted natural stone foundation. All roofs are covered with slate.

Håkonsæt Fjellvilla is a mountain villa. It is situated in the centre of Hovet, near Hallingskarvet National Park, 15 minutes from Skisenter Hallingskarvet in Sudndalen, Hovet. and 20 min from the ski resorts of Geilo.

Hallingdal
Hovet belongs to the traditional district of Hallingdal, the Halling Valley, created by the Hallingdalselva or Hallingdal River. "Elva" is Norwegian for river. The Hallingdal River, also named "big river" or Storåni, originates from the Hardangervidda national park, streams via Hallingskarvet national park into the Hivju River, and from there into the Hivjufossen. The Hivjufossen streams into the river Storåne, which originates from two different mountainous areas: 1. the Geiteryggen area into the direction of Sudndalen, via the Hivjufossen outflow, into the direction of Hovet, and 2. the plateau of Stolsvatnet. These two river branches unite at the cross road of the FV50 and Grønsetlivegen in Hovet, named Storåne, which streams out into the Hovsfjorden, to follow its course from there, deeper into the valley of Hallingdal, as Hallingdalselva, into the direction of Oslo.

Hallingdal dialect
The residents of Hovet speak one of the several Hallingdal dialects, which are known as Hallingmål. These dialects have been studied, analysed, and compared with each other. The language of the Vikings, the old Norwegian language, gammel norsk, is still present in the Norwegian dialects. The areas in Norway that have been isolated from the modernising world have saved the old Norwegian language for disappearing. Centuries after the end of the deadly disease Black Death which took the lives of at least the half of the Norwegian people between 1347 and 1351, the Danish invaded Norway. Norway belonged to Denmark from 1523 (Kalmar Union) till 17 May 1814. The Danish and Norwegian language merged into what we know now as Bokmål, the official language, which exists next to the Nynorsk language.

Natural monuments
 Hovsfjorden is a nature reserve, a reservoir lake and partially a wetland.
 Hivjufossen, a 250 meters high waterfall, at the border of national park Hallingskarvet
 Strandavatnet, a regulated lake, at the border of national park Hallingskarvet
 Stolsvatnet, a regulated lake and a unique biotope.

Notable residents
 Pål Olson Grøt  ~ nationally renowned Rosemåling painter.
 Kristian Øvrevollseie  ~ nationally renowned fiddler of traditional music
 Per Villand ~ Molecular biologist; scholar; author of the book: "Søre Villand og Raggsteindalen 1889-2005 : slekta, garden og turisthytta"; contributed to the research of amyotrophic lateral sclerosis; the main character of a 2005 documentary about ALS, produced by Lillehammer University College.
 Knut Bry ~ internationally renowned art photographer. 
 Rudi Juchelka ~ internationally renowned sculptor and fine artist 
 Håvard Bøkko ~ internationally renowned speedskater
 Hege Bøkko ~ internationally renowned speedskater

Etymology
The name "Hovet", and some other names in Hovet as a village, might be related with the Vikings. The literal translation of the place name "Hovet" is: "the hov". The word "hov" can be found in literature about sacred spaces in Viking law and religion, where is explained that "hov" is an old Norwegian word for "shrine".

A common place name element is hov (Old Norwegian), or hof, which denotes a heathen shrine. Scholars, however, do not believe it likely that all of the hof names originally meant "temple" or "shrine", rather most would have referred to a small building or area of a farmstead devoted to heathen worship. There is no evidence of buildings used solely as pagan temples being widespread in Scandinavia. As almost all of the places with names compounded in hof are actually farmsteads, an original meaning along the lines of "farm where cult meetings were held by the locals" might be more appropriate (Sproston).

Also the old Norwegian word "land" is related with pagan sites of worships. In Hovet the name Villand (Vill land means: Wild land) is often present: Villandsvegen, an area named Villand, where two families with this name live, the one family lives in Nørdre Villand, the northern side of the Villandsvegen, the other family lives at the southern side of the Villandsvegen, in Søre Villand. They are not relatives. When watching more upward on the same Hol Kommune map there is a pond named Villandstjødne on Mapcarta, tagged also as Villandstjørne as the Norwegian name, what might be an indication that stjødne is the dialect word in Hallingdal for stjørne. On the Hol Kommune map this pond is named Villandstjørne. The name Villandstjørne is a combination of the name Villand and tjørne. Tjørne is: lake, pond, tarn. Villandstjørne means the pond of Villand.

More names in the same area of Villandstjødne refer to sacred spaces in the Viking law and religion: Mørk, Mörk in Old Norwegian, meaning: forest, and categorized as sacred woods and groves. Very near to Villand is an area with the name Mørk; Hovsfjorden contains the word hov and fjorden. Both words are related with sacred spaces: hov (shrine) and fjörðr, old Norwegian for the word fjord, categorized in sacred spaces as bodies of water; Nese, headland where the river Storåne streams into Hovsfjorden. In the name Nese is the old Norwegian word Nes, which means headland, and which belongs to the sacred spaces of bodies of water; Vikabergi, next to Hovsfjorden, contains the old Norwegian name Vik, which means inlet. Vik is categorized as a sacred space of bodies of water; Torsbunatten is a hill. The name could be divided into «Tor»: the mythical god Thor, «bu», old Norwegian for several explanations of simple buildings, like a little house in nature, and «natten» as the Norwegian word for night. Other possibility could be to divide it in «Tor», and «bunatten», as a possible plural form of bunad in the Hallingdal dialect. Bunad is a traditional costume in Norway. The plural form of bunad however in Norwegian is bunader, not bunatten.

History
 Digitalt Museum - Old photos of Hovet
 Hol Bygdemuseum - Old buildings of Hovet

Literature
 Ellingsgard, Nils (1978): "Rosemåling i Hallingdal" - Dreyers Forlag Oslo, 1978; 
 Hattfjelldal folkebibliotek: Ellingsgard, Nils (1978): "Rosemåling i Hallingdal"
 Hilda Roderick Ellis Davidson (1989): Myths and Symbols in Pagan Europe: Early Scandinavian and Celtic Religions
 Kåre Olav Solhjell: Hol i hundre år', Bind III, p. 485 ~ Trykk: 07-Gruppen, Oslo ~ 
 Per Villand: Søre Villand og Raggsteindalen 1889-2005 : slekta, garden og turisthytta; Geilo Bibliotek, Hol municipality, Norway

Gallery

References

Hallingdal
Villages in Buskerud
Hol